The 2000 Konica V8 Lites Series was an Australian motor racing competition for V8 Supercars. It was the inaugural standalone series for the second tier of V8 Supercar racing. The series began on 26 March 2000 at the Eastern Creek Raceway and finished on 27 August at Mallala Motor Sport Park and was contested over five rounds across four different states.

The series was won by Dean Canto who placed first in five of the fifteen races of the series and finished 31 points ahead of Matthew White. Wayne Wakefield placed third.

Vehicle eligibility
All cars were required to comply with the Technical Regulations applicable to V8 Supercars as defined within CAMS Group 3A. Eligible models were Ford and Holden vehicles up to, but not including, the Ford AU Falcon and the Holden VT Commodore.

Teams and drivers
The following teams and drivers competed in the 2000 Konica V8 Lites Series.

Race calendar
The series was contested over five rounds. Each round comprised three races.

Points system
Points were awarded for the top ten positions in each race on the following basis:

Series standings

See also
 2000 Australian Touring Car season

References

External links
 Image of Dean Canton (Ford Falcon EL) at the opening round of the 2000 Konica V8 Lites Series, speedcafe.com via web.archive.org

Konica
Supercars Development Series